Beta Fornacis (Beta For, β Fornacis, β For) is the Bayer designation for a solitary star in the southern constellation of Fornax. It is visible to the naked eye with an apparent visual magnitude of 4.46. Based upon an annual parallax shift of 18.89 mas, it is located around 173 light years away from the Sun. At that distance, the visual magnitude is reduced by an interstellar extinction factor of 0.1.

This is an evolved, G-type giant star with a stellar classification of G8 III. It is a  red clump giant, which means it has undergone helium flash and is currently generating energy through the fusion of helium at its core. The star has an estimated 1.53 times the mass of the Sun and has expanded to 11 times the Sun's radius. It is radiating over 55 times the solar luminosity from its outer atmosphere at an effective temperature of 4,820 K.

Beta Fornacis has a visual companion, CCDM J02491-3224B, which has an apparent visual magnitude of approximately 14.0. As of 1928, it lay at an angular separation of 4.80 arc seconds along a position angle of 67°. Located around three degrees to the southwest is the globular cluster NGC 1049.

References

G-type giants
Horizontal-branch stars
Double stars
Fornax (constellation)
Fornacis, Beta
CD-32 01025
017652
013147
841